This is a list of listed buildings in Varde Municipality, Denmark.

The list

References

External links 

 Danish Agency of Culture

Buildings and structures in Varde Municipality
Varde